The European Shooting Championships are the European championships for ISSF sport shooting disciplines, including 10m air rifle and air pistol, cartridge rifle (50m and 300m) and pistol (25m and 50m). Sometimes the competition also includes trap shooting, skeet and running target shooting events, usually organized in special championships.

The championships are organised by the European Shooting Confederation (ESC) with the support of the International Shooting Sport Federation (ISSF).

The first edition of the championships took place in 1955 in Bucharest. It takes place biennially, but every year 2-4 special championships held for European countries in separate shooting disciplines.

In reaction to the 2022 Russian invasion of Ukraine, the European Shooting Confederation stripped Russia of its right to host the 2022 European Shooting Championships in the 25m, 50m, 300m, running target and shotgun.

Summary of Championships

1955-1990

1990-2020

Global Shooting Championships

The European Championship Shotgun will take place in Larnaca, Cyprus, on August 24 — September 12, 2022.

The European Championship 25m/50m will take place in Wroclaw, Poland, on September 5-18, 2022.The competitions will include events for Men and Women as well as Men Junior and Women Junior.

Special Shotgun Championships
European Shotgun  Championships were first held in 1956. The 2020 edition was  deleted for COVID-19.

Special 10 m Events Championships

Special 300 m Rifle Championships

Special Running Target Championships

Unofficial Championships
From 1929 to 1954 the European Championships was disputed only in clay pigeon shooting.

See also
List of medalists at the European Shooting Championship
European Junior Shooting Championships
World Shooting Championships

References and notes

External links
ISSF Results Overview
European Championships in all Shooting disciplines and events 
European Championships complete archive results (2010-2020) at European Shooting Confederation
https://esc-shooting.org/news/read/discover-the-history-of-european-championships-706
https://esc-shooting.org/documents/european_championships
https://esc-shooting.org/storage/2022/02/03/ef39be93512c26f5c17ad278a0d67e6432635f67.pdf
https://esc-shooting.org/storage/2022/02/03/7a18d67d261e3a2d60d63e5825b56ff33f3b3d09.pdf
https://esc-shooting.org/storage/2022/02/03/79199b0d095d359f2840791488cc8287adf6da11.pdf

 
European championships
European
Shooting sports in Europe by country